The wild man is a figure of medieval European art, literature and folklore.

Wild man may also refer to:

People
Wild Man, a name for bigfoot, sasquatch, or similar creatures
Pavlo Ishchenko (born 1992), Ukrainian-Israeli boxer nicknamed Wild Man 
Ishi (c. 1860–1916), "Wild Man of Oroville", the last member of the Yahi tribe of California
Wild Man Fischer (1944–2011), American songwriter

Arts, entertainment, and media
Wild Man (film), 1977 New Zealand comedy
"Wild Man" (Kate Bush song), 2011
"Wild Man" (Ricky Van Shelton song)
Wild Man, a 2005 sculpture by hyperrealistic artist Ron Mueck

See also
Wild Man of Borneo (disambiguation)
Wildman (disambiguation)